Charlotte "Penny" DeHaven (May 17, 1948 – February 23, 2014) was an American country and gospel music singer. At the beginning of her career, she recorded as Penny Starr.

She was born in Winchester, Virginia, United States, she is best known for her country hit singles in the late 1960s and early 1970s. Her biggest hit was "Land Mark Tavern", a duet with Del Reeves in 1970.

DeHaven's other singles included country remakes of such pop hits as Billy Joe Royal’s "Down in the Boondocks" (1969), The Beatles’ "I Feel Fine" (1970), The Everly Brothers’ "Crying in the Rain" (with Reeves, 1972), and Marvin Gaye’s "I'll Be Doggone" (1974).

Her albums included 1972's Penny DeHaven and 2011's gospel collection A Penny Saved.

As an actress, she made two guest appearances on the CBS-TV/syndicated TV show Hee Haw in 1972–73.  She also appeared in the movies Traveling Light, Country Music Story, the 1973 horror movie Valley of Blood, and the 1974 TV series Funny Farm.

DeHaven died from cancer on February 23, 2014, at the age of 65.

Discography

Albums

Singles

References

External links

1948 births
2014 deaths
American women country singers
American country singer-songwriters
People from Winchester, Virginia
American gospel singers
United Artists Records artists
Singer-songwriters from Virginia
21st-century American women